Teodoro "Teddy" Acevedo Casiño (born 15 November 1968) is a Filipino activist, writer, and journalist. He was a member of the House of Representatives for Bayan Muna.

Early life and career
Born in Davao City to middle class parents, Casiño finished elementary education at the De La Salle University (DLSU) in 1982. He continued his high school studies at La Salle Green Hills, where his stint as a volunteer for the National Movement for Free Elections (NAMFREL) in the 1986 snap elections swept him into the politics of People Power via the EDSA Revolution.

The EDSA experience, plus the stories about hunger in Negros, moved him to forego a DLSU scholarship to study agriculture in UP Los Baños, where he became an activist in his freshman year. He became editor in chief of the student paper, The UPLB Perspective, from 1989–1991 even as he consistently made it to the honor roll.

In 1991, Casiño was elected national president of the College Editors Guild of the Philippines (CEGP), an alliance of over 700 student publications nationwide. He chose to delay his thesis requirement to work full-time for the CEGP. He eventually graduated from UPLB with the degree of BA Sociology in 1993, with his thesis bringing him to faraway Pamplona town in Cagayan Valley, where he studied the impact of Church activism on rural communities.

Activism

After his stint in the student movement, Teddy joined the Kilusang Mayo Uno (KMU - May First Movement). His childhood ambition and his father's wishes for him to become a lawyer gave way to his activism. In 1996, he entered the UP College of Law only to leave it three days later when it interfered with his work in the KMU.

After four years in the KMU, he joined the Bagong Alyansang Makabayan (BAYAN), the largest alliance of progressive people's organizations in the country. He was elected secretary general in 1999 and was catapulted to national prominence in 2001 as one of the youngest leaders of EDSA 2.

Casino was appointed commissioner of the EDSA People Power Commission but was removed for constantly being critical of the current administration.  He had a short stint in ABS-CBN's Hoy Gising and The Correspondents. In 2002, he was accorded the UPLB Distinguished Alumni Award for Extension.

As a writer, Casino was a regular contributor to the Philippine Daily Inquirers Youngblood column from 1994-1996. In 1995, he became a regular columnist for Business World, one of the most respected business newspapers in the country. He also wrote columns for the tabloids People's Bagong Taliba and Frontpage, the OFW weekly Pinoy Gazette and the online magazine Bulatlat.com.

Legislative career
In the May 2004 elections, Casino was elected as Bayan Muna's representative in Congress.  With the re-election of Bayan Muna in the 2007 partylist polls, he returned to Congress.

 15th Congress 

In the 15th Congress, Casino became the chairman of the Committee on Small Business and Entrepreneurship Development, where he champions the welfare of our micro, small and medium enterprises.  As chairperson of the Committee, Casino also spearheads Buy Pinoy, Build Pinoy! - a grassroots campaign promoting the consumption of Filipino-made products and the development of integrated, world-class Filipino industries.

He is also senior vice chairperson of the Committee on Higher and Technical Education, safeguarding the youth's right to affordable and quality education.

 Authored laws and bills LawsCasino is the one of the principal authors of four laws that have benefited the poor and marginalized sectors, namely:

 The Public Attorneys Act of 2007 (R.A. 9406) which strengthened the Public Attorneys Office and expanded its free legal services to poor litigants;
 The Tax Relief Act of 2009 (R.A. 9504) which exempts minimum wage earners from withholding taxes;
 The Rent Control Act of 2009 (R.A. 9653) which put a cap on rent for low-income earners;
 The Anti-Torture Act of 2009 (R.A. 9745) which penalizes torture.

Aside from this, he has authored a total of 178 authored and 376 co-authored measures, making him the 4th most prolific congressman in the 15th Congress.Bills'
Casino's main advocacy is the lowering of prices of electricity, oil and water as well as regulation of the cost of education, healthcare, mobile communications, toll fees and other basic utilities and services. Towards this end, he has filed bills on:

 The removal of VAT on power (HB 2719), oil (HB 1630) and toll fees (HB 5303)
 The regulation of oil prices (HB 4355), mobile phone services (HB 5653), tuition fees (HB 1961) and interest rates (HB 4917).

He has consistently opposed the budget cuts in Philippine state colleges and universities as well as the privatization of public hospitals and water districts.

As a relentless fighter of corruption and government abuse, Casino is also the principal author of

 The Whistleblowers Protection and Rewards Bill (HB 132),
 The Freedom of Information Bill (HB 133), the Anti-Dynasty Bill (HB 3413)
 The House version of the Anti-Epal Bill (HB 2309).

References

External links

List of bills authored
R.A. 9406 Public Attorneys Act of 2007 (H.B. 5921)
R.A. 9504 Tax Relief Act of 2009 (H.B. 3971)
R.A. 9653 Rent Control Act of 2009 (H.B. 6098)
R.A. 9745 Anti-Torture Act of 2009 (H.B. 5709)
H.B. 2719
H.B. 1630
H.B. 5303
H.B. 4355
H.B. 5653
H.B. 1961
H.B. 4917
H.B. 132
H.B. 133
H.B. 3413
H.B. 2309

Filipino journalists
Alternative journalists
1968 births
Living people
Members of the House of Representatives of the Philippines for Bayan Muna
People from Davao City
Politicians from Davao del Sur
People from Makati
University of the Philippines Los Baños alumni